François Xavier Tabao Manjarimanana (born 1927 in Ankatafana) was a Malagasy clergyman and prelate for the Roman Catholic Diocese of Mananjary. He was appointed bishop in 1975. He died in 1999.

References 

1927 births
1999 deaths
Malagasy Roman Catholic bishops